Population density (in agriculture: standing stock or plant density) is a measurement of population per unit land area. It is mostly applied to humans, but sometimes to other living organisms too. It is a key geographical term. In simple terms, population density refers to the number of people living in an area per square kilometre, or other unit of land area.

Biological population densities 
Population density is population divided by total land area, sometimes including seas and oceans, as appropriate.

Low densities may cause an extinction vortex and further reduce fertility. This is called the Allee effect after the scientist who identified it. Examples of the causes of reduced fertility in low population densities are:
 Increased problems with locating sexual mates
 Increased inbreeding

===Human densities===

Population density is the number of people per unit of area, usually transcribed as "per square kilometer" or square mile, and which may include or exclude, for example, areas of water or glaciers. Commonly this is calculated for a county, city, country, another territory or the entire world.

The world's population is around 8,000,000,000 and the Earth's total area (including land and water) is 510,000,000 km2 (197,000,000 sq. mi.). Therefore, from this very crude type of calculation, the worldwide human population density is approximately 7,800,000,000 ÷ 510,000,000 = 15.3/km2 (40 per sq. mi.). However, if only the Earth's land area of 150,000,000 km2 (58,000,000 sq. mi.) is taken into account, then human population density is 50/km2 (129 per sq. mi.). This includes all continental and island land area, including Antarctica. However, if Antarctica is excluded, then population density rises to over 55 persons/km2 (over 142 per sq. mi.).
  
Several of the most densely populated territories in the world are city-states, microstates and urban dependencies. In fact, 95% of the world's population is concentrated on just 10% of the world's land. These territories have a relatively small area and a high urbanization level, with an economically specialized city population drawing also on rural resources outside the area, illustrating the difference between high population density and overpopulation.

Deserts have very limited potential for growing crops as there is not enough rain to support them. Thus, their population density is generally low. However, some cities in the Middle East, such as Dubai, have been increasing in population and infrastructure growth at a fast pace.Cities with high population densities are, by some, considered to be overpopulated, though this will depend on factors like quality of housing and infrastructure and access to resources. Very densely populated cities are mostly in Asia (particularly Southeast Asia); Africa's Lagos, Kinshasa, and Cairo; South America's Bogotá, Lima, and São Paulo; and Mexico City and Saint Petersburg also fall into this category.City population and especially area are, however, heavily dependent on the definition of "urban area" used: densities are almost invariably higher for the center only than when suburban settlements and intervening rural areas are included, as in the agglomeration or metropolitan area (the latter sometimes including neighboring cities).

In comparison, based on a world population of 7.8 billion, the world's inhabitants, if conceptualized as a loose crowd occupying just under 1 m2 (10 sq. ft) per person (cf. Jacobs Method), would occupy a space a little larger than Delaware's land area.

Countries and dependent territories

Other methods of measurement 
Although the arithmetic density is the most common way of measuring population density, several other methods have been developed to provide alternative measures of population density over a specific area.
 Arithmetic density: The total number of people / area of land
 Physiological density: The total population / area of arable land
 Agricultural density: The total rural population / area of arable land
 Residential density: The number of people living in an urban area / area of residential land
 Urban density: The number of people inhabiting an urban area / total area of urban land
 Ecological optimum: The density of population that can be supported by the natural resources
 Living density: Population density at which the average person lives

See also 
 Distance sampling
 Demography
 Human geography
 Idealised population
 List of population concern organizations
 Plant density
 Population dynamics
 Population decline
 Population growth
 Population genetics
 Population health
 Population momentum
 Population pyramid
 Rural transport problem
 Significant figures
 Small population size

Lists of entities by population density 
 List of Australian suburbs by population density
 List of countries by population density
 List of cities by population density
 List of city districts by population density
 List of English districts by population density
 List of European Union cities proper by population density
 List of islands by population density
 List of states and territories of the United States by population density

References

External links 
 Selected Current and Historic City, Ward & Neighborhood Density
 

 
Environmental controversies
Geography
Human overpopulation
Population ecology
Demography